Nannoniscus is genus of crustaceans.

Species
The following species occur within the genus Nannoniscus:
Nannoniscus acanthurus Birstein, 1963
Nannoniscus aequiremus Hansen, 1916
Nannoniscus affinis Hansen, 1916
Nannoniscus analis Hansen, 1916
Nannoniscus antennaspinis Brandt, 2002
Nannoniscus arcticus Hansen, 1916
Nannoniscus arctoabyssalis Just, 1980
Nannoniscus australis Vanhöffen, 1914
Nannoniscus bidens Vanhöffen, 1914
Nannoniscus brenkei Kaiser & Kihara, 2021
Nannoniscus camayae Menzies, 1962
Nannoniscus caspius G. O. Sars, 1897
Nannoniscus coalescum (Menzies & George, 1972)
Nannoniscus cristatus Mezhov, 1986
Nannoniscus detrimentus Menzies & George, 1972
Nannoniscus hilario Kaiser & Kihara, 2021
Nannoniscus inermis Hansen, 1916
Nannoniscus laevis Menzies, 1962
Nannoniscus laticeps Hansen, 1916
Nannoniscus magdae Kaiser & Kihara, 2021
Nannoniscus menoti Kaiser & Kihara, 2021
Nannoniscus menziesi Mezhov, 1986
Nannoniscus meteori (Brandt, 2002)
Nannoniscus minutus Hansen, 1916
Nannoniscus muscarius Menzies & George, 1972
Nannoniscus oblongus G. O. Sars, 1870
Nannoniscus ovatus Menzies & George, 1972
Nannoniscus pedroKaiser & Kihara, 2021
Nannoniscus perunis Menzies & George, 1972
Nannoniscus plebejus Hansen, 1916
Nannoniscus profundus Svavarsson, 1982
Nannoniscus reticulatus Hansen, 1916
Nannoniscus simplex Hansen, 1916
Nannoniscus spinicornis Hansen, 1916
Nannoniscus teres Siebenaller & Hessler, 1981

References

Isopoda
Crustaceans described in 1916
Taxa named by Hans Jacob Hansen
Isopod genera